Walter Ferraz de Negreiros (born 6 August 1946), simply known as Negreiros, is a Brazilian retired footballer who played as a midfielder.

Honours

Player
Santos
Intercontinental Supercup: 1968
Recopa Sudamericana: 1968
Campeonato Paulista: 1967, 1968, 1969

Coritiba
Campeonato Paranaense: 1972, 1973, 1974

Manager
Roma Barueri
Copa São Paulo de Futebol Júnior: 2001

References

1946 births
Living people
Sportspeople from Santos, São Paulo
Brazilian footballers
Association football midfielders
Santos FC players
Grêmio Foot-Ball Porto Alegrense players
Coritiba Foot Ball Club players
Brazilian football managers